Irving Ralph Newhouse (October 16, 1920 – March 29, 2001) was an American farmer and politician in the state of Washington. He served in the Washington House of Representatives from 1965 to 1980 and in the Senate from 1980 to 1999.

References

1920 births
2001 deaths
Republican Party members of the Washington House of Representatives
20th-century American politicians
People from Sunnyside, Washington
Republican Party Washington (state) state senators